Inzago ( or  ) is a comune (municipality) in the Metropolitan City of Milan in the Italian region of Lombardy, located about  northeast of Milan.

Inzago borders the following municipalities: Pozzo d'Adda, Masate, Gessate, Cassano d'Adda, Bellinzago Lombardo, Pozzuolo Martesana.

The brothers Luca, Disma, Adolfo, and Polibio Fumagalli were all born in Inzago. All were composers; Adolfo, Luca, and Disma were pianists, and Polibio was an organist.  Also born in Inzago were the supercentenarian Maria Redaelli, the architect Giuseppe Boretti, the Venerable Benigno Calvi, and the cyclist Gabriele Missaglia.

References

External links
 Official website

Cities and towns in Lombardy